Several ships of the Swedish Navy have been named HSwMS Helsingborg, named after the city of Helsingborg:

  was a ship launched in 1749
  was a  launched in 1943 and decommissioned in 1978
  was a  launched in 2003 and commissioned in 2006

Swedish Navy ship names